Facundo Javier Pérez Castro (born 7 August 1981 in  San Miguel de Tucumán, Tucumán Province) is an Argentine football midfielder .

Career

Pérez Castro came through Argentinos Juniors' youth system to make his debut for the club in 1999. He played for the club until 2007, in 2002 the club were relegated to the Primera B Nacional but Pérez Castro stayed with them and helped them to secure promotion back to the Primera Division in 2004.

Pérez Castro moved to Gimnasia for the start of Apertura 2007 tournament, but he was separated from the professional team by Carlos Ramacciotti in January 2008. However, when Omar Labruna replaced Ramacciotti as Gimnasia's manager Pérez Castro returned to the first team and even scored his first goal with the club against Lanús.

He played the 2008-09 season for San Martín de Tucumán but could not help his team to avoid relegation. The following season, he was acquired by Arsenal de Sarandí.

For the 2010–11 he played for Olympiakos Volou F.C in the Superleague Greece.

References

External links
 Argentine Primera statistics

1981 births
Living people
Sportspeople from San Miguel de Tucumán
Argentine footballers
Association football midfielders
Argentinos Juniors footballers
Argentine Primera División players
Super League Greece players
Gimnasia y Esgrima de Jujuy footballers
San Martín de Tucumán footballers
Arsenal de Sarandí footballers
Olympiacos Volos F.C. players
Shanghai Shenhua F.C. players
Guangdong Sunray Cave players
Argentine expatriate footballers
Expatriate footballers in Greece
Expatriate footballers in China
Chinese Super League players
Argentina under-20 international footballers